Monica Seles defeated Steffi Graf in the final, 7–6(8–6), 6–4 to win the women's singles tennis title at the 1990 French Open. Aged 16 years and 6 months, she became the youngest major singles champion in the Open Era at the time, and remains the youngest French Open champion in history.

Arantxa Sánchez Vicario was the defending champion, but she lost in the second round to Mercedes Paz.

This tournament also saw a semifinal appearance for future world No. 1 Jennifer Capriati. Aged only 14 years and 70 days, she became the youngest tennis player ever to reach a French Open semifinal and, following this tournament, the youngest player ever to enter the top ten in rankings.

Seeds

Qualifying

Draw

Finals

Top half

Section 1

Section 2

Section 3

Section 4

Bottom half

Section 5

Section 6

Section 7

Section 8

References

External links
1990 French Open – Women's draws and results at the International Tennis Federation

Women's Singles
French Open by year – Women's singles
French Open - Women's Singles
1990 in women's tennis
1990 in French women's sport